Ben Böhmer (born 1994) is a German composer, producer and DJ from Göttingen, Germany. He primarily produces and performs deep and progressive house music, and is currently signed on to the labels Anjunadeep, Keller Records, Cercle Music, and his own label - Ton Töpferei. He lives in Berlin.

Career 

Ben Böhmer played piano and trumpet in his childhood before he began to compose music with the synthesizer.

At the end of 2015 he produced his first single, Promise You, which appeared on the Mauerblümchen (Ger., wallflower) compilation of the label Ton Töpferei, based in his home town of Göttingen, Germany. On November 1, 2016, the eponymous Promise You EP, also on Ton Töpferei, was released. This was followed by other releases on Keller Records, Ostfunk Records, Bade Records, Audiolith Records, Carton-Pate Records, The Soundgarden Records and Freundchen Records.

After witnessing some success, Ben's Submission EP was released in 2017 on the label Sacrebleu, headed by German DJ duo AKA AKA, which was founded in the same year.

On 22 September 2017 Böhmer published the single Flug & Fall on the fourth exploration compilation of the London label Anjunadeep. Shortly thereafter in early 2018, another release - Morning Falls EP, followed.

Böhmer has performed at the Distortion Festival 2017 in Copenhagen, at the Habitat Festival, Anjunadeep Open Air in London and at the Tomorrowland Festival in Belgium, in 2018. Ben Böhmer has also performed in Cyprus, the Czech Republic, France, Italy, Spain, Greece and India. He also performed at Group Therapy 300 in Hong Kong, an annual concert headlined by Above & Beyond. This was his first performance at a Group Therapy event.

In July 2018, he released another 3 track EP - Dive, on the Anjunadeep label. In the same year, he collaborated with fellow Anjunadeep artist Lane 8 to release a remix of  his track 'Hold On'.

In November 2019, he released his debut LP - Breathing, on the label Anjunadeep.

Discography

Albums 

 Breathing (2019)
 Breathing (Remixed) (2020)
 Live From Printworks London (2020)
 Begin Again (2021)

EPs 
 Black Pattern (2014)
 Faltering (2015)
 The Blender (2016)
 Promise You (2016)
 Submission (2017)
 Morning Falls (2018)
 Dive (2018)
 Fliederregen/Reflection (2019)
 Phases (2020)
 The Apparitions (with Rob Moose) (2022)

Singles 
 Purple Line (Vom Menschen, Keller records 2017)
 Faltering (2015)
 Dive (2018)
 Ground Control (2018)
 Black Hole (with Monolink, 2019)
 Lost in Mind (Volen Sentir Mixes) (with Malou, 2020)
 Cappadocia (2020)
 Run Away (with Tinlicker featuring Felix Raphael, 2021)
 Weightless (With Panama, 2021)
 Beyond Beliefs (2021)
 Escalate (With JONAH, 2021)
 Erase (With lau.ra, 2021)
 A Matter Of Time (2021)

References

External links 
 www.benboehmer.com
 Ben Böhmer at Resident Advisor

Living people
German DJs
21st-century German composers
Electronic dance music DJs
1994 births